The military districts in Russia serve as administrative divisions for the Russian Armed Forces. Each district features a geographical territory based on Russia's federal subjects, and a headquarters administering the military formations based in the respective territory.

There are currently five military districts in Russia: Western, Central, Eastern, Southern and Northern.

List of military districts

26 December 1991 

After the dissolution of the Soviet Union, Russia maintained a diminishing number of former Soviet Armed Forces military districts.

 Leningrad Military District
Moscow Military District
North Caucasus Military District
Volga Military District
Urals Military District
Siberian Military District
Transbaikal Military District
Far East Military District
Kaliningrad Special Region

27 July 1998 
Military districts of Russia according to Decree of the President of Russia No. 900 on 27 July 1998.

Leningrad Military District
Moscow Military District
North Caucasus Military District
Volga Military District
Urals Military District
Siberian Military District
Far East Military District
Kaliningrad Special Region

1 September 2001 

Volga Military District and Urals Military District was merged into the Volga-Urals Military District according to
Decree of the President of Russia № 337с on 24 March 2001.

Decree of the President of Russia No. 1764 (12 December 2008) changed names of regions after federal subjects mergers.

Leningrad Military District
Moscow Military District
North Caucasus Military District
Volga-Urals Military District
Siberian Military District
Far East Military District
Kaliningrad Special Region

1 September 2010 

Leningrad Military District, Moscow Military District and Kaliningrad Special Region were merged to form the Western Military District.

Western Military District
North Caucasus Military District
Volga-Urals Military District
Siberian Military District
Far East Military District

1 December 2010 

Since 1 December 2010, all military districts except the Western Military District had been replaced by three larger districts, based on recommendations of the 2008 Russian military reforms. The Central Military District was formed from a merger of the Volga-Urals Military District and most of the Siberian Military District, with the remainder (Buryatia and Zabaykalsky Krai) transferred to the Far East Military District to form the Eastern Military District. The North Caucasus Military District was replaced with the Southern Military District. The reform was according to Decree of the President of Russia No. 1144 on 20 September 2010.

Western Military District with headquarters in Saint Petersburg
Southern Military District with headquarters in Rostov-on-Don
Central Military District with headquarters in Ekaterinburg
Eastern Military District with headquarters in Khabarovsk

2 April 2014 

The Southern Military District was enlarged to include disputed territories of the Republic of Crimea and Sevastopol following the 2014 Russian annexation of Crimea.

15 December 2014 

On 15 December 2014, the Northern Fleet of the Russian Navy was removed from the Western Military District and the boundaries of its jurisdiction expanded to form the Northern Fleet Joint Strategic Command. The new military command included Murmansk Oblast, Arkhangelsk Oblast, and numerous Russian islands in the Arctic Ocean.

1 January 2021
The Northern Fleet Joint Strategic Command was the only military command to be transformed into a fully fledged military district, according to President Vladimir Putin's Decree of 5 June 2020. Since 1 January 2021, the Northern Fleet has held the status of a military district, and its joint strategic command has become the Northern Military District.\

17 January 2023 
Russian authorities re-established the Moscow and Leningrad military districts.

See also 
 Military districts of the Russian Empire
 Military districts of the Soviet Union

References

External links 

 
Lists of subdivisions of Russia